Mimi Maynard is an American film and television actress (including voice acting) who is also a casting director and film producer.

Career
Since 1975, she has appeared in at least ten films and seventeen television productions, including voicing the character "I.Q's Mom" in the animated family-adventure film Fly Me to the Moon (2008).

She has also worked extensively in voice casting and sound design.

Film

References

External links
 
 

American casting directors
Women casting directors
American film actresses
American film producers
Living people
American sound designers
American television actresses
American voice actresses
Year of birth missing (living people)
Place of birth missing (living people)
American voice directors
American women film producers
Keach family
21st-century American women